Cypraeoidea, the cowries and cowry allies,  is a superfamily of sea snails, marine gastropods included in the clade Littorinimorpha. This superfamily had been called Cypraeacea and was named by Rafinesque in 1815.

Shell description
This superfamily of sea snails have adult shells which do not look like typical gastropod shells because the spire of the shell is not visible in adults, instead the shells are: often quite rounded in shape, varying from globular to elongate, and with a long, very narrow, aperture which is sometimes toothed. The snails in these families have no operculum.

The shells of almost every species in this superfamily are very smooth and shiny, and this is because in the living animal, the shell is nearly always fully covered with the mantle.

The largest known fossil cowry was Gisortia gigantiea Munster, 1828 which reached a length of 350mm. The largest modern cowry is the Atlantic Deer Cowry (Macrocypraea cervus) at up to 190mm. The largest known cowry from any extant subfamily or genus was the Australian cowry  Zoila (Gigantocypraea) gigas (McCoy, 1867) at about 247mm.

Nomenclature
This superfamily used to be known as Cypraeacea. Prior to the recent ruling by the ICZN, many invertebrate superfamily names ended in the suffix -acea, or -aceae, not -oidea as now required according to ICZN article 29.2. The suffix -oidea used to be used for some subclasses and superorders, where it is still found. In much of the older literature including Keen 1958, gastropod superfamilies are written with the suffix -acea.

Taxonomy

2005 taxonomy 
The following two subfamilies were recognized in the taxonomy of Bouchet & Rocroi (2005):
Cypraeidae
Ovulidae

2007 taxonomy 
Fehse (2007) elevated the subfamily Pediculariinae to the family Pediculariidae, and the tribe Eocypraeini to the family Eocypraeidae. Both of these groups were removed from the Ovulidae and raised to family level, based on research on their morphological and molecular phylogenic qualities. Families within Cypraeoidea are as follows:

Cypraeidae
 Eratoidae Gill, 1871
Ovulidae
 Triviidae Troschel, 1863
 Velutinidae Gray, 1840
Synonyms
 Amphiperatidae Gray, 1853: synonym of Ovulidae J. Fleming, 1822
Eocypraeidae : synonym of Eocypraeinae Schilder, 1924
 Lamellariidae d'Orbigny, 1841: synonym of Lamellariinae d'Orbigny, 1841
 Pediculariidae Gray, 1853: synonym of Pediculariinae Gray, 1853

References

External links 

 
Littorinimorpha
Taxa named by Constantine Samuel Rafinesque